Hanna Ożogowska (20 July 1904 in Warsaw – 27 May 1995 in Warsaw) was a Polish novelist and poet.

She graduated from Special Pedagogy Institute and Pedagogy Faculty of Free Polish University (Wolna Wszechnica Polska). She debuted in 1932 in a weekly magazine Płomyk as a child literature author. She worked in secondary schooling in Łódź till 1951. After World War II she was the president of Pedagogical Secondary School for Kindergarten Educators in Łódź. She was the editor of Płomyk.

Prizes
1956 - Golden Cross of Merit
1959 - Prime Minister's Award
1967 - Medal of the National Education Commission
1968 - Knight's Cross of the Order of Polonia Restituta
1974 - Order of the Smile (Order Uśmiechu)
1974 & 1981 - Eagle's Feather prize (Orle Pióro)
1979 - the title of "Distinguished Teacher of the PRL"
1984 - State Prize
1984 - Golden Cross of Merit of the Polish Scouting and Guiding Association
1984 - Commander's Cross of the Order of Polonia Restituta
1985 - Award of the City of Warsaw

Bibliography
1950 O ślimaku, co pierogów z serem szukał
1950 Uczniowie III klasy
1951 Na Karolewskiej
1952 Swoimi słowami
1953 Nową drogą przez nowy most
1955 W Marcelkowej klasie
1955 Bajka o kłosku pszenicy
1957 Malowany wózek
1957 Marcinkowe wierszyki
1957 Złota kula
1959 Tajemnica zielonej pieczęci
1960 O królewnie, która bała się, że jej korona z głowy spadnie
1960 Scyzoryk i koledzy
1960 Chłopak na opak czyli Z pamiętnika pechowego Jacka
1961 Dziewczyna i chłopak czyli Heca na czternaście fajerwerek (film adaptation: Dziewczyna i chłopak)
1963 Raz, gdy chciałem być szlachetny
1964 Herring's Ear (Ucho od śledzia) (entered on the IBBY Honour List in 1966)
1968 Głowa na tranzystorach
1971 Koleżanki
1972 Za minutę pierwsza miłość
1980 Przygody Scyzoryka
1983 Entliczki pentliczki
1987 Lusterko dla każdej dziewczyny
1989 Druga klasa - fajna klasa!
1989 Piórko do pióreczka

References 

1904 births
1995 deaths
Polish women novelists
Burials at Powązki Cemetery
Commanders of the Order of Polonia Restituta
Recipients of the Gold Cross of Merit (Poland)
20th-century Polish novelists
Polish women poets
20th-century women writers
20th-century Polish poets
Recipients of the State Award Badge (Poland)
20th-century Polish women